The One That Got Away is a 2018 Philippine romantic comedy series starring Dennis Trillo, Rhian Ramos, Lovi Poe and Max Collins. The series premiered on GMA Network's GMA Telebabad evening block and worldwide via GMA Pinoy TV on January 15, 2018 to May 18, 2018, replacing My Korean Jagiya.

NUTAM (Nationwide Urban Television Audience Measurement) People in Television Homes ratings are provided by AGB Nielsen Philippines.

Series overview

Episodes

January 2018

February 2018

March 2018

April 2018

May 2018

References

Lists of Philippine drama television series episodes